Legislative elections were held in France on 8 February 1871 to elect the first legislature of the French Third Republic, the unicameral National Assembly. The elections were held during a situation of crisis in the country, as following the Franco-Prussian War, 43 departments were occupied by Prussian forces. As a result, all public meetings were outlawed and Paris was the only city where an election campaign took place.

The electoral law allowed candidates to run in more than one seat at a time. As a result, several candidates were elected in more than one seat, with Adolphe Thiers elected in 86 constituencies. A series of by-elections were subsequently held on 2 July to elect representatives for the 114 vacant seats.

This election saw the victory of monarchists (Legitimists and Orleanists), favourable to peace with the German Empire, with a large majority.

Results

See also
1871 French legislative election in Algeria

References

Legislative elections in France
France
Legislative
Legislative elections
France